is a freight terminal on the Kagoshima Main Line in Kokura Kita-ku, Kitakyūshū, Japan, operated by Japan Freight Railway Company (JR Freight). Presently the terminal handles no scheduled trains.

References

Railway stations in Fukuoka Prefecture
Stations of Japan Freight Railway Company
Railway freight terminals in Japan
Railway stations in Japan opened in 1969